Ian Midlane (born 2 February 1976) is an English actor, known for portraying the role of Al Haskey on the BBC soap opera Doctors. For his performance as Al, he won the award for Best Comedy Performance at the 2018 British Soap Awards.

Career
In 2004, Midlane made his television debut in an episode of the ITV series The Last Detective as a fire officer. He then appeared in "Revenge of the Slitheen", a two part episode of the CBBC series The Sarah Jane Adventures. In 2011, he made his film debut in Swinging with the Finkels. In 2012, Midlane began portraying the role of Al Haskey in the BBC soap opera Doctors. Before this, he appeared in an episode of Doctors in 2005, in the role of Brian Flannery. In 2018, he appeared in the film The Last Witness. Later that year, he won the award for Best Comedy Performance at the British Soap Awards. Midlane has also written three episodes of Doctors.

Filmography

Awards and nominations

References

External links
 

1976 births
21st-century English male actors
English male film actors
English male soap opera actors
Living people